Cleary University is a private university focused on business education with its main campus in Livingston County, Michigan. It also has an education center located in Detroit. Cleary University offers certificate, ABA, BBA, MS, and MBA programs.

History 

Founded in 1883, by Patrick Roger Cleary as the Cleary School of Penmanship, it was incorporated in 1891 as Cleary Business College. In 1933, the Cleary family turned the physical assets of the college over to a Board of Trustees, establishing Cleary College as an independent non-profit institution. In 1938 Patrick Roger Cleary retired and his son, Owen Cleary, became president. The college moved to the 2170 Washtenaw Avenue site in 1960. A branch college was opened in Livingston County in 1979. By 1982, the combined campuses served over one thousand students. " In 2002, Cleary introduced a graduate program and changed its name to Cleary University.

Livingston Campus 
The Livingston Campus of Cleary University is in Genoa Charter Township, Michigan, in Howell.

Johnson Center 
The Lloyd & Mabel Johnson Center for Business & Community Excellence is the focus of the Livingston Campus. The Johnson Center is equipped to serve as the University's conference center. It is divided into 8 classrooms, an internet café, commercial kitchen, and a few offices.

Chrysler Building 
The Chrysler Building was Cleary's first building on the Livingston Campus. It is home to a majority of classes on the Livingston campus, the on-campus recording studio, the student-run campus store, the student cafeteria "Clancy's Café," and the Arthur Secunda Art Museum, which houses the largest collection of works by American artist Arthur Secunda.

Lyons Building 
The newly-renovated Lyons building is home to Cleary University's administrative staff, financial aid department, and president's office.

Wellness Center 
Previously the administration building, the Wellness Center now houses Cleary's athletic offices. The building offers students 2 basketball courts, a weight room, locker rooms, athletic training, a student lounge, and a demonstration kitchen.

Residence halls 
Cleary University has two residence halls. The first was built in 2016 and the second in 2018. They are named "North Hall" and "South Hall," respectively. North Hall primarily houses upperclassmen and South Hall primarily houses first-year students.

Detroit campus 
Located at the Considine Little Rock Family Center at 8904 Woodward Avenue, the center is designed to prepare Detroit residents for job opportunities, providing a range of programs from one-year certificates to bachelor's degree programs. Programs are available online or in-center.

Athletics 
The Cleary athletic teams are called the Cougars. The university is a member of the National Association of Intercollegiate Athletics (NAIA), primarily competing in the Wolverine-Hoosier Athletic Conference (WHAC) for most of its sports since the 2018–19 academic year; while its men's wrestling program competes in the Sooner Athletic Conference (SAC). They were also a member of the United States Collegiate Athletic Association (USCAA) from 2012–13 (when the school re-instated back its athletics program) to 2018–19. The Cougars previously competed as an NAIA Independent within the Association of Independent Institutions (AII) when they joined the NAIA during the 2017–18 school year.

Cleary competes in 15 intercollegiate varsity sports: Men's sports include baseball, bowling, cross country, golf, hockey, soccer, track & field and wrestling; bowling, cross country, golf, soccer, softball and track & field; and co-ed sports include eSports. Former sports included men's & women's lacrosse and co-ed competitive dance.

History 
Cleary University sponsored both football and basketball in the early years of the university's history but dropped athletics at some point.  The current athletic department was created in 2012 and joined the USCAA. Starting in 2012 with men's and women's cross country in the fall and men's and women's golf in the spring, the university rapidly expanded the athletics program in the years following. The university was awarded the 2017 USCAA's Director's Cup, which is awarded annually to the athletic program that achieves the most cumulative success in the 80-member association. Standings are based on a points system and algorithm, with points awarded on the basis of sports offered and results of national championship events. In 2014 and again in 2015 the woman's cross country team placed second at the National Championships. In 2016, the woman's cross country team placed first at the National Championships. The men's cross country team was able to compete for its first time at the National Championships and ended up placing third. 2015 marked the universities first National Champion team in Men's Golf. The university also had the individual National Champion in woman's cross country in 2013 and 2014, as well as the individual National Champion in men's golf in 2015. In the 2019–20 academic year, Cleary University would add a men's and women's hockey team starting in the fall of 2019.

Alumni 
Vern Buchanan, U.S. Congressman
Winsor McCay, cartoonist
Daniel Milstein, entrepreneur and writer
Scott Sigler, author
Ernie Zeigler, college basketball coach
Linda Puchala, member of the National Mediation Board

References

External links 

 
 Official athletics website

Business schools in Michigan
Education in Livingston County, Michigan
Universities and colleges in Washtenaw County, Michigan
Educational institutions established in 1883
Education in Ann Arbor, Michigan
Buildings and structures in Livingston County, Michigan
USCAA member institutions
1883 establishments in Michigan
Michigan State Historic Sites in Washtenaw County, Michigan
Private universities and colleges in Michigan